This is a list of national roads in Latvia:

State main roads

State regional roads

State local roads 
Approximately one thousand roads in Latvia are categorised under the state local road category.

These roads are designated by the letter V by the Latvian State Roads, but this classification not used in signage.

External links

References 

.
National Roads
Latvia
National Roads